Staroturbeyevo (İśke Tırbıy) is a rural locality (a selo) in Michurinsky Selsoviet, Sharansky District, Bashkortostan, Russia. The population was 96 as of 2010. There is 1 street.

Geography 
Staroturbeyevo is located 16 km northeast of Sharan (the district's administrative centre) by road. Bulansaz is the nearest rural locality.

References 

Rural localities in Sharansky District